Ahmad Wali Massoud (born 1 November 1964) is an Afghan politician and diplomat who is the founder and chairman of the Massoud Foundation in Afghanistan and is the younger brother of the late Ahmad Shah Massoud.

Massoud obtained a degree in diplomatic studies from University of Westminster, London in 1989. He has served as Afghan ambassador to the UK, special representative of Ahmad Shah Massoud in Europe, and the representative of the Jamiat-e Islami Party in London. He is the founder of a political party called Nahzat-e-Melli-ye Afghanistan (National Movement Party of Afghanistan). He is the founder of the Mandegar Daily newspaper and the history magazine Yad–e-Yar (The Memory of Friends). Massoud published the National Agenda, his first book, in 2012. In September 2021, TRT World journalist Samuel Ramani was able to speak with Massoud. During the interview, which was published in the 21 September edition of TRT World, Massoud stated that the Resistance still controls much of the Valley and downplayed the reported strength of the Taliban, which he described as "leaderless." Ramani stated that his interview with Massoud was conducted the week before it was published. During the interview, Massoud also described former Afghanistan President Ashraf Ghani's government as too corrupt to survive and also cast doubt on the notion that the Taliban had the military capacity to successfully take power without outside assistance, accusing US Special Envoy to Afghanistan Zalmay Khalilzad of having a role in orchestrating their return to power. Massoud also described Chairman of the Joint Chiefs of Staff Mark Milley’s September 1, 2021 assertion that the Taliban could fight ISIS-K as "very naive."

See also
 Ahmad Shah Massoud
 Ahmad Zia Massoud
 Ahmad Massoud

References

Afghan politicians
Afghan Tajik people
Living people
Ambassadors of Afghanistan to the United Kingdom
1964 births